Transversotrema espanola is a species of parasitic platyhelminthe found in lutjanines on Heron Island and Lizard Island.

References

Further reading
Cribb, Thomas H., et al. "Biogeography of tropical Indo-West Pacific parasites: A cryptic species of Transversotrema and evidence for rarity of Transversotrematidae (Trematoda) in French Polynesia." Parasitology international 63.2 (2014): 285–294.
Bray, Rodney A., and Thomas H. Cribb. "Are cryptic species a problem for parasitological biological tagging for stock identification of aquatic organisms?."Parasitology 142.01 (2015): 125–133.

External links

Plagiorchiida
Parasitic helminths of fish